Izaura TV is a television channel operated by TV2 Group that broadcasts in Hungary. It is a telenovella channel, and it was launched on 14 August 2016 at 20:00 CET.

Shows

External links
Official website

References 

Central European Media Enterprises
Television networks in Hungary
Television channels and stations established in 1997
1997 establishments in Hungary